Ray Donovan is an American crime drama television series created by Ann Biderman for Showtime. The  twelve-episode first season premiered on June 30, 2013.

The pilot episode broke viewership records, becoming the biggest premiere of all time on Showtime. In February 2020, the series was cancelled after seven seasons. The show's storyline concluded with the feature-length Ray Donovan: The Movie, which premiered on January 14, 2022, on Showtime.

The drama, starring Liev Schreiber in the title role, is set primarily in Los Angeles (during seasons 1–5) and in New York City (during seasons 6–7). The main character, Ray Donovan, is a professional "fixer" who arranges bribes, payoffs, threats, crime-scene clean-up, and other illegal activities to protect his (usually) celebrity clients. Good at his job, he is also normally devoted to his children and brothers but has a complicated relationship with his wife. He encounters problems when his menacing father, Mickey Donovan (Jon Voight), is unexpectedly released from prison. The FBI attempts to bring down Mickey and his associates, and Donovan struggles to escape the undertow.

Episodes

Cast and characters

Main 

 Liev Schreiber as Raymond "Ray" Donovan
 Paula Malcomson as Abigail "Abby" Donovan, Ray's wife (seasons 1–5)
 Eddie Marsan as Terrence "Terry" Donovan, Ray's older brother. He is a former boxer, and suffers from Parkinson's disease.
 Dash Mihok as Brendan "Bunchy" Donovan, Ray's younger brother. He identifies as a sexual anorexic.
 Pooch Hall as Daryll Donovan, Ray's younger half-brother (son of Mickey and Claudette)
 Steven Bauer as Avi Rudin, Ray's right-hand man, a former IDF soldier and ex–Mossad agent (seasons 1–5)
 Katherine Moennig as Lena Burnham, Ray's investigative assistant
 Kerris Dorsey as Bridget Donovan, Ray's daughter
 Devon Bagby as Conor Donovan, Ray's son (seasons 1–6)
 Jon Voight as Michael "Mickey" Donovan, Ray's father
 Susan Sarandon as Samantha "Sam" Winslow, Ray's new boss (recurring season 5; season 6)
 Graham Rogers as Jacob "Smitty" Smith, Bridget's boyfriend turned husband (recurring season 5; seasons 6–7)

Recurring 

 Elliott Gould as Ezra Goldman (seasons 1–3)
 Peter Jacobson as Lee Drexler (seasons 1–3)
 Denise Crosby as Debra "Deb" Goldman (seasons 1–5)
 William Stanford Davis as Potato Pie (seasons 1–5)
 Ambyr Childers as Ashley Rucker (seasons 1–2, 4)
 Josh Pais as Stuart "Stu" Feldman (seasons 1–2, 4, 6–7)
 Sheryl Lee Ralph as Claudette (seasons 1–2, 7)
 Paul Michael Glaser as Alan (seasons 1–2, 7)
 Austin Nichols as Thomas "Tommy" Wheeler (seasons 1–4, 7)
 Brooke Smith as Frances Simpson (seasons 1–3)
 Michael McGrady as Frank Barnes (seasons 1–5)
 Craig Ricci Shaynak as Kenneth "Tiny" Benson (seasons 1–2)
 Octavius J. Johnson as Marvin Gaye Washington (seasons 1–2)
 Frank Whaley as FBI Agent Van Miller (season 1)
 Johnathon Schaech as Sean Walker (season 1)
 James Woods as Patrick "Sully" Sullivan (season 1)
 Rosanna Arquette as Linda (season 1–2)
 Kwame Patterson as Re-Kon (seasons 1–2)
 Mo McRae as Deonte Frasier (seasons 1–2)
 Jay Thomas as Marty Grossman (seasons 1–3, 5)
 Hank Azaria as Ed Cochran (seasons 2–4)
 Sherilyn Fenn as Donna Cochran (season 2)
 Ann-Margret as June Wilson (season 2)
 Kip Pardue as FBI Agent Thomas Volcheck (season 2)
 Andrea Bogart as Megan Volchek (season 2)
 Wendell Pierce as Ronald Keith (seasons 2–3)
 Crispin Alapag as Pablo Ramirez (season 2)
 Vinessa Shaw as Kate McPherson (season 2)
 Jeryl Prescott as Cherry (season 2)
 Omar Dorsey as Cookie Brown (season 2)
 Jamie Donnelly as Peggy Shaugnessy (season 2)
 Eion Bailey as Steve Knight (season 2)
 Brian Geraghty as Detective Jim Halloran (season 2)
 Steph DuVall as Shorty (season 2)
 Heather McComb as Patty (season 2)
 Jayne Taini as Harriet Greenberg (seasons 2–5)
 Ian McShane as Andrew Finney (season 3)
 Katie Holmes as Paige Finney (season 3)
 Guy Burnet as Casey Finney (season 3)
 Jason Butler Harner as Varick Strauss (season 3)
 Leland Orser as Father Romero (seasons 3–4)
 Michael Hyatt as Detective Sheila Muncie (seasons 3–4)
 Christy Williams as Michelle (season 3)
 Nick Kent as Davros Minassian (season 3)
 Ken Davitian as Vartan Minassian (season 3)
 Grace Zabriskie as Mrs. Minassian (season 3)
 Shree Crooks as Audrey (season 3)
 Aaron Staton as Greg Donellen (seasons 3–4)
 Alyssa Diaz as Teresa (seasons 3–6)
 Lulu Brud as Lauren (seasons 3 and 6)
 Fairuza Balk as Ginger (season 3)
 Bronson Pinchot as Flip Brightman (season 3)
 Embeth Davidtz as Sonia Kovitzky (season 4)
 Richard Brake as Vlad (season 4)
 Stacy Keach as The Texan (season 4)
 Pasha D. Lychnikoff as Ivan Belikov (season 4)
 Ismael Cruz Córdova as Hector Campos (season 4)
 Lisa Bonet as Marisol Campos (season 4)
 Dominique Columbus as Damon Bradley (seasons 4–5)
 Tom Wright as Punch Hoffman (seasons 4–5)
 Derek Webster as Jackson Holt (seasons 4–5)
 Tara Buck as Maureen Dougherty Donovan (seasons 4–5)
 Raymond J. Barry as Dmitri Sokolov (season 4)
 Ted Levine as Little Bill Primm (season 4)
 Gabriel Mann as Jacob Waller (season 4)
 Paula Jai Parker as Sylvie Starr (season 4)
 C. Thomas Howell as Dr. Brogan (seasons 5–6)
 Donald Faison as Antoine A'Shawn Anderson (seasons 5–6)
 Rhys Coiro as Rob Heard (season 5)
 Lili Simmons as Natalie James (season 5)
 Michel Gill as Doug Landry (season 5)
 Brian J. White as Jay White (seasons 5–6)
 Kim Raver as Dr. Bergstein (season 5)
 James Keach as Tom (season 5)
 Jordan Mahome as Damon's father (season 5)
 Adina Porter as Vicki Delgatti (season 5)
 Ryan Dorsey as Duquesne "Dime Bag" Baker (season 5)
 Keir O'Donnell as George Winslow (seasons 5–6)
 Jake Busey as Acid Man/Chef Dave (season 5)
 Billy Miller as Todd Dougherty (season 5)
 Ryan Radis as Beckett (season 5)
 Domenick Lombardozzi as NYPD Sgt. Sean "Mac" McGrath (season 6)
 Gerard Cordero as Big Al (season 6)
 Kate Arrington as Amber McGrath (seasons 6–7)
 Tony Curran as NYPD Lt. Mikey "Rad" Radulovic (season 6)
 Lola Glaudini as Anita Novak (season 6)
 Jacob Ming-Trent as Big Easy (season 6)
 Alexandra Turshen as Justine Smith (season 6)
 Sandy Martin as Sandy Donovan (seasons 6–7)
 Zach Grenier as Mayor Ed Feratti (seasons 6–7)
 Alan Alda as Dr. Arthur Amiot (seasons 6–7)
 Chris Tardio as Danny Bianchi (season 6–7)
 Quincy Tyler Bernstine as Detective Perry (season 7)
 Louisa Krause as Liberty Larson (season 7)
 Michael Esper as Adam Rain (season 7)
 Josh Hamilton as Kevin Sullivan (season 7)
 Kerry Condon as Molly Sullivan (season 7)
 Clay Hollander as Johnathan Walker Hanson (season 7)
 Keren Dukes as Jasmine (season 7)
 Peter Gerety as James Sullivan (season 7)
 Kevin Corrigan as Declan Sullivan (season 7)

Cancellation and feature-length film 

On February 4, 2020, Showtime cancelled the series after seven seasons.

The series was cancelled without any advance warning, leaving fans and showrunner, David Hollander, in shock. Season 8 was supposed to have been the final season, and Hollander already had a plan in place creatively for the story.

A week later, Liev Schreiber wrote on his Instagram account that due to fans' support and activity in media, there was a possibility for Ray Donovan to return. The decision to cancel the series was reportedly for political reasons amid the recent merger between CBS, which owns Showtime, and Viacom, which "did not recognize the power of the fan base and social media".
On August 19, Schreiber commented on his Instagram that "an RD finale/movie" was being written.

On February 24, 2021, Showtime announced a feature-length film to conclude the storyline, to premiere in 2022, with David Hollander directing it and co-writing with Schreiber. The network brought them the idea of a film after fans' outrage. The two-hour format gave them an ability "to work in very cinematic language". Beside the original cast returning, Chris Petrovski, AJ Michalka, David Patrick Kelly and Chris Gray had joined the film.

On November 22, the official trailer and poster for the film, titled Ray Donovan: The Movie were released, with a premiere date of January 14, 2022 and tagline "You can't outrun your legacy".

Home media 

The first season was released on DVD and Blu-ray on June 10, 2014. The second season was released on both media on May 26, 2015 and the third season released on December 29, 2015. Further seasons were released only on DVD. The fourth season saw a release on December 27, 2016, the fifth season on January 30, 2018, the sixth season came out on April 9, 2019, and the seventh season on May 5, 2020.

Indian remake 
In 2021, Netflix India announced that it will broadcast a remake of the series, titled Rana Naidu with starring Rana Daggubati and his uncle Venkatesh. The series will be produced by Locomotive Global and the format rights are licensed by ViacomCBS Global Distribution Group (now Paramount Global Content Licensing), with Karan Anshuman as showrunner and director and Suparn Verma as co-director.

Reception

Critical response 

Ray Donovan has received positive reviews from critics. Rotten Tomatoes gives the first season a rating of 77% based on reviews from 43 critics, with the site's consensus stating: "Ray Donovan moves quickly between genres and tones, with Liev Schreiber and Jon Voight's performances making the whiplash worth it". Metacritic gives the first season a weighted average score of 75 out of 100, based on reviews from 36 critics, indicating "generally positive reviews".

Tim Goodman, writing for The Hollywood Reporter, said that "Showtime has another gem on their hands" and the casting of Liev Schreiber and Jon Voight was "gold".

Accolades

References

External links 

 
 
 
 Ray Donovan at Rotten Tomatoes

2013 American television series debuts
2020 American television series endings
2010s American crime drama television series
2010s American legal television series
2020s American crime drama television series
2020s American legal television series
English-language television shows
Lesbian-related television shows
Neo-noir television series
Police corruption in fiction
Serial drama television series
Showtime (TV network) original programming
Television series about families
Television series about organized crime
Television series about show business
Television series by CBS Studios
Television series created by Ann Biderman
Television shows adapted into films
Television shows filmed in Los Angeles
Television shows filmed in New York City
Television shows set in Los Angeles
Television shows set in New York City